The 2014 California gubernatorial election was held on November 4, 2014, to elect the Governor of California, concurrently with elections for the rest of California's executive branch, as well as elections to the United States Senate in other states and elections to the United States House of Representatives and various state and local elections.

Incumbent Democratic Governor Jerry Brown ran for re-election to a second consecutive and fourth overall term in office. Although governors are limited to lifetime service of two terms in office, Brown previously served as governor from 1975 to 1983, and the law only affects terms served after November 6, 1990.

A primary election was held on June 3, 2014. Under California's nonpartisan blanket primary law, all candidates appear on the same ballot, regardless of party. In the primary, voters may vote for any candidate, regardless of their party affiliation. The top two finishers — regardless of party — advance to the general election in November, even if a candidate manages to receive a majority of the votes cast in the primary election. Washington is the only other state with this system, a so-called "top two primary" (Louisiana has a similar "jungle primary"). Brown and Republican Neel Kashkari finished first and second, respectively, and contested in the general election, which Brown won. He won the largest gubernatorial victory since 1986, "despite running a virtually nonexistent campaign."

Primary election

A certified list of candidates was released by the Secretary of State on March 27, 2014. The primary election took place on Tuesday, June 3, 2014, from 7am to 8pm.

Party candidacies

Democratic Party

Declared

 Akinyemi Agbede, candidate for Mayor of Orange County, Florida in 2010
 Jerry Brown, incumbent Governor of California

Withdrew

 Geby Espinosa, gym owner
 Hanala Sagal, author and fitness personality
 Michael Strimling, attorney

Declined

 Kamala Harris, Attorney General of California (ran for re-election)
 Gavin Newsom, Lieutenant Governor of California (ran for re-election)
 Hilda Solis, former United States Secretary of Labor and former U.S. Representative (ran for Los Angeles County Board of Supervisors)
 Antonio Villaraigosa, former Mayor of Los Angeles

Republican Party

Declared
 Richard Aguirre, real estate investor and Democratic candidate for governor in 2010
 Glenn Champ, businessman and engineer
 Tim Donnelly, state assemblyman and Minuteman founder
 Neel Kashkari, former Acting Assistant Secretary of the Treasury for Financial Stability
 Alma Marie Winston

Withdrew
 Andrew Blount, Mayor of Laguna Hills
 Dennis Jackson, manufacturer
 Abel Maldonado, former Lieutenant Governor of California, candidate for Controller in 2006, and candidate for CA-24 in 2012

Declined
 Kevin McCarthy, U.S. Representative and House Majority Whip
 John Moorlach, Orange County Supervisor
 Steve Poizner, former Insurance Commissioner of California and candidate for governor in 2010
 George Radanovich, former U.S. Representative
 Meg Whitman, CEO of Hewlett-Packard, former CEO of eBay and nominee for governor in 2010

Libertarian Party

Declined
 James P. Gray, former Orange County Superior Court Judge and Libertarian Party nominee for Vice President of the United States in 2012

Green Party

Declared
 Luis J. Rodriguez, author, progressive activist and Justice Party nominee for Vice President of the United States in 2012

American Independent Party
Endorsed Tim Donnelly

Withdrew
 Robert Ornelas, American Independent Party nominee for Vice President of the United States in 2012

Peace and Freedom Party

Declared
 Cindy Sheehan, anti-war activist and Peace and Freedom Party nominee for Vice President of the United States in 2012

Independent

Declared
 Bogdan Ambrozewicz, small business owner, Independent candidate for the State Senate in 2012 and Republican candidate for the State Assembly in 2011
 Janel Buycks, minister/business owner
 Rakesh Kumar Christian, small business owner, independent candidate for governor in 2010
 Joe Leicht, golf course operator
 Robert Newman, psychologist, farmer and Republican candidate for governor in 2003, 2006, and 2010

Polling

Results

General election

Debates
Complete video of debate, September 4, 2014 - C-SPAN

Predictions

Polling

Results
Brown won easily, by nearly twenty points. He outperformed his majority margin from 2010. As expected, Brown did very well in Los Angeles and in the San Francisco Bay Area. Kashkari conceded defeat right after the polls closed in California.

Results by County

{|class="wikitable sortable" style=" font-size:100%"
|- bgcolor=lightgrey
! width="1%" | County
! width="1%" | Brown
! width="1%" | %
! width="1%" | Kashkari
! width="1%" | %
|-
|align="center" |Alameda
|align="center"|293,081
|align="center"|82.2
|align="center"|63,593
|align="center"|17.8
|-
|align="center" |Alpine
|align="center"|284
|align="center"|61.9
|align="center"|175
|align="center"|38.1
|-
|align="center" |Amador
|align="center"|5,682
|align="center"|44.6
|align="center"|7,071
|align="center"|55.4
|-
|align="center" |Butte
|align="center"|29,520
|align="center"|47.8
|align="center"|32,249
|align="center"|52.2
|-
|align="center" |Calaveras
|align="center"|6,870
|align="center"|43.7
|align="center"|8,841
|align="center"|56.3
|-
|align="center" |Colusa
|align="center"|1,789
|align="center"|42.7
|align="center"|2,398
|align="center"|57.3
|-
|align="center" |Contra Costa
|align="center"|174,403
|align="center"|68.6
|align="center"|79,660
|align="center"|31.4
|-
|align="center" |Del Norte
|align="center"|3,488
|align="center"|49.6
|align="center"|3,539
|align="center"|50.4
|-
|align="center" |El Dorado
|align="center"|27,916
|align="center"|45.5
|align="center"|33,443
|align="center"|54.5
|-
|align="center" |Fresno
|align="center"|76,143
|align="center"|47.6
|align="center"|83,744
|align="center"|52.4
|-
|align="center" |Glenn
|align="center"|2,049
|align="center"|34.4
|align="center"|3,908
|align="center"|65.6
|-
|align="center" |Humboldt
|align="center"|24,003
|align="center"|64.6
|align="center"|13,146
|align="center"|35.4
|-
|align="center" |Imperial
|align="center"|13,457
|align="center"|64.3
|align="center"|7,484
|align="center"|35.7
|-
|align="center" |Inyo
|align="center"|2,317
|align="center"|42.7
|align="center"|3,112
|align="center"|57.3
|-
|align="center" |Kern
|align="center"|54,269
|align="center"|40.9
|align="center"|78,417
|align="center"|59.1
|-
|align="center" |Kings
|align="center"|8,752
|align="center"|39.2
|align="center"|13,575
|align="center"|60.8
|-
|align="center" |Lake
|align="center"|10,722
|align="center"|61.3
|align="center"|6,775
|align="center"|38.7
|-
|align="center" |Lassen
|align="center"|2,213
|align="center"|32.4
|align="center"|4,609
|align="center"|67.6
|-
|align="center" |Los Angeles
|align="center"|978,142
|align="center"|66.8
|align="center"|485,186
|align="center"|33.2
|-
|align="center" |Madera
|align="center"|9,974
|align="center"|37.2
|align="center"|16,825
|align="center"|62.8
|-
|align="center" |Marin
|align="center"|69,751
|align="center"|79.4
|align="center"|18,147
|align="center"|20.6
|-
|align="center" |Mariposa
|align="center"|2,499
|align="center"|38.2
|align="center"|4,038
|align="center"|61.8
|-
|align="center" |Mendocino
|align="center"|17,340
|align="center"|71.8
|align="center"|6,825
|align="center"|28.2
|-
|align="center" |Merced
|align="center"|18,945
|align="center"|50.1
|align="center"|18,848
|align="center"|49.9
|-
|align="center" |Modoc
|align="center"|770
|align="center"|27.2
|align="center"|2,061
|align="center"|72.8
|-
|align="center" |Mono
|align="center"|1,632
|align="center"|53.1
|align="center"|1,442
|align="center"|46.9
|-
|align="center" |Monterey
|align="center"|51,315
|align="center"|69.4
|align="center"|22,591
|align="center"|30.6
|-
|align="center" |Napa
|align="center"|25,846
|align="center"|68.2
|align="center"|12,059
|align="center"|31.8
|-
|align="center" |Nevada
|align="center"|20,976
|align="center"|54.6
|align="center"|17,419
|align="center"|45.4
|-
|align="center" |Orange
|align="center"|275,707
|align="center"|44.4
|align="center"|344,817
|align="center"|55.6
|-
|align="center" |Placer
|align="center"|51,241
|align="center"|45.4
|align="center"|61,604
|align="center"|54.6
|-
|align="center" |Plumas
|align="center"|2,966
|align="center"|41.7
|align="center"|4,139
|align="center"|58.3
|-
|align="center" |Riverside
|align="center"|165,340
|align="center"|47.1
|align="center"|185,805
|align="center"|52.9
|-
|align="center" |Sacramento
|align="center"|202,416
|align="center"|62.3
|align="center"|122,342
|align="center"|37.7
|-
|align="center" |San Benito
|align="center"|8,654
|align="center"|63.5
|align="center"|4,969
|align="center"|36.5
|-
|align="center" |San Bernardino
|align="center"|134,417
|align="center"|46.9
|align="center"|152,458
|align="center"|53.1
|-
|align="center" |San Diego
|align="center"|346,419
|align="center"|51.1
|align="center"|331,942
|align="center"|48.9
|-
|align="center" |San Francisco
|align="center"|196,745
|align="center"|88.2
|align="center"|26,442
|align="center"|11.8
|-
|align="center" |San Joaquin
|align="center"|62,614
|align="center"|53.5
|align="center"|54,331
|align="center"|46.5
|-
|align="center" |San Luis Obispo
|align="center"|46,606
|align="center"|54.3
|align="center"|39,186
|align="center"|45.7
|-
|align="center" |San Mateo
|align="center"|120,280
|align="center"|75.2
|align="center"|39,615
|align="center"|24.8
|-
|align="center" |Santa Barbara
|align="center"|64,912
|align="center"|58.3
|align="center"|46,503
|align="center"|41.7
|-
|align="center" |Santa Clara
|align="center"|288,732
|align="center"|72.9
|align="center"|107,113
|align="center"|27.1
|-
|align="center" |Santa Cruz
|align="center"|56,977
|align="center"|78.6
|align="center"|15,499
|align="center"|21.4
|-
|align="center" |Shasta
|align="center"|21,509
|align="center"|38.1
|align="center"|35,007
|align="center"|61.9
|-
|align="center" |Sierra
|align="center"|679
|align="center"|44.2
|align="center"|857
|align="center"|55.8
|-
|align="center" |Siskiyou
|align="center"|6,103
|align="center"|44.2
|align="center"|7,717
|align="center"|55.8
|-
|align="center" |Solano
|align="center"|57,874
|align="center"|64.6
|align="center"|31,754
|align="center"|35.4
|-
|align="center" |Sonoma
|align="center"|107,328
|align="center"|74.8
|align="center"|36,249
|align="center"|25.2
|-
|align="center" |Stanislaus
|align="center"|46,566
|align="center"|51.5
|align="center"|43,786
|align="center"|48.5
|-
|align="center" |Sutter
|align="center"|8,688
|align="center"|42.7
|align="center"|11,644
|align="center"|57.3
|-
|align="center" |Tehama
|align="center"|5,408
|align="center"|35.2
|align="center"|9,952
|align="center"|64.8
|-
|align="center" |Trinity
|align="center"|1,711
|align="center"|44.2
|align="center"|2,163
|align="center"|55.8
|-
|align="center" |Tulare
|align="center"|23,708
|align="center"|38.4
|align="center"|37,996
|align="center"|61.6
|-
|align="center" |Tuolumne
|align="center"|7,951
|align="center"|46.7
|align="center"|9,058
|align="center"|53.3
|-
|align="center" |Ventura
|align="center"|106,072
|align="center"|53.1
|align="center"|93,797
|align="center"|46.9
|-
|align="center" |Yolo
|align="center"|31,431
|align="center"|69.1
|align="center"|14,043
|align="center"|30.9
|-
|align="center" |Yuba
|align="center"|5,166
|align="center"|41.6
|align="center"|7,245
|align="center"|58.4

References

External links
California gubernatorial election, 2014 at Ballotpedia

2014
California
Gubernatorial
2014